Assia Ahhatt (born June 3, 1955) is a Ukrainian violinist and singer. Ahhatt gained international notoriety in 2013 with her first single, “If Only Tonight” receiving over three million views.

Early life and education 
She was born in Kyiv, capital of former Ukrainian Soviet Socialist Republic.  She graduated from Glier College of Music and National Music Academy, both located in Kyiv, Ukraine. After her graduation, she completed an internship at The Music Academy in Nice, France.

Career 
Assia was the soloist of the Ukrainian National Philharmonic.  During a short period of time, Assia was able to achieve significant results in her professional career. She performed at well-known concert halls in Germany, France, Italy and other European countries, and won nominations and awards in several European music festivals and competitions.

Her first solo release in 1999, “Homo Novus,” represented a mix of instrumental and modern music (classical music in a self composed modern arrangement). To promote this album, Assia toured over the biggest cities nationwide.

Assia Ahhatt began her career as a singer in 2002. That same year, she signed a deal with EMI records (Poland).

Later Assia signed another deal  - with Universal Poland, and recorded a song ‘Where are you now?’ in duet with Polish-born Hollywood actor Bogusław Linda. The song instantly became a hit in several European countries.  Linda also starred in the video for the above-mentioned song. In 2022, Assia also signed with Universal/Ukrainian Records as well.

Her next album “Chocolad” (Chocolate) was released in 2003, it contained songs in Russian, Polish and French. Later Assia decided to surprise her fans by performing the song “Mechty” (Dreams) in an unknown language which she created by herself. This song, along with other ones, composed by Assia herself, were included into the new album “Dysha bolela” (Soul Hurts) and released in 2005.

In 2005, Assia formed the duo “69” and became its producer and co-songwriter. Albums ‘Goryachiy pocelui’ (Горячий поцелуй; Hot Kiss) and ‘I Like It’ were released in 2006, in partnership with "69".

In 2007, her new album “Я лучшая” (Ya lychshaya, I Am the Best) was released. In 2010, Assia released the album “Angeli ne kuryat” (Ангелы не курят, Angels Don't Smoke).

She has successfully combined her singing and songwriting talents, having appeared on stage with iconic performers including Robert Plant, Mark Knopfler, Jean-Luc Ponty, and Pierre Blanchard. She also performed with musicians such as Kurt Elling and trumpet player Chris Botti, and award-winning music composer Eric Serra.

Assia Ahhatt records in the leading studios in Europe and the West Lake Studio in Los Angeles, USA. Studios was recorded her debut U.S. single “If only tonight" (2013) that instantly became a hit in America and headed several U.S. Charts:

 Billboard's Hot Single Chart (#6 in Billboard's 2014 - Singles Chart)
 DRT National Airplay Top 50 Independent Chart
 DRT National Airplay Top 50 R&B/ Hip Hop Chart
 Indie Label Report-Rhythmic

“If Only Tonight” remix, made by legendary DJ Ralphi Rosario, became an instant hit in major dance clubs from New York to Miami, Los Angeles to Honolulu; and was featured on Billboard's National Dance Club Chart for several consecutive weeks.

Following the success of “If Only Tonight” Assia turned her attention towards the Latin market. Ahhat's next single, ‘Fiesta in San Juan’, ft. Puerto Rican rapper, Wisin, is a dynamic dance composition, infused with the sounds of the wonderful violin solo. ‘Fiesta in San Juan’ was again in Billboard's Latin Tropical Chart, and its remix rapidly approaches Top 10 in Billboard's National Dance Club Chart.

The dynamic video appearance of Assia and WISIN's interplay in Spanish, filmed in Old San Juan, was produced and directed by Hollywood music video director, Jessy Terrero.

Continuing her evolution as a pop performer incorporating two unique and memorable instruments – violin and voice, Assia released her award-winning single Disco, produced by Dmitry Monatik, Chilibisound in 2016. In April 2017, Assia debut her single, Perepletaet, to audiences in her home city of Kiev.

Assia's next single ‘You Will Miss Me' which was released in 2017 was produced by Luny Tunes, and was recorded at Hit Factory Criteria in Miami.

Perhaps, one of the biggest achievement of her illustrious musical career, album ‘All-In’ was released in 2018 in the U.S. Assia contracted her personal recording label, “Seize the Day Entertaining” with one of the music world's legendary producers, 16-times Grammy winner Humberto Gatica, based in Los Angeles. Known for his association with Madonna, Elton John, Celine Dion, Toni Braxton, and Andrea Boccelli, among many others, Gatica knew this musical collaboration with Assia was the stuff of awards and sold-out venues. The project features Assia performing violin solos which cover thirteen international hit singles, supported by a full orchestra. Assia's several tours, fulfilled both nationally and internationally, had tremendous success.

Next, a violinist's live show “A Music Extravaganza” was directed by PBS award-winning producer Gene Bortnick and recorded in the Opera House of Kiev in Ukraine. The show aired across America on PBS stations from June 2019 until early 2020 and based upon its success, it was aired again in September 2020. 

Assia Ashatt conceived her new album ‘A Date at the Movies’, while on her U.S. concert tour for ‘A Music Extravaganza’ in 2019 and 2020. In this album, released in August 2020, Assia invited listeners to experience joy through the scores from the world's best-loved films. New classical arrangements for the music cover some of the biggest stars ever to perform including Barbra Streisand and Elvis Presley to Celine Dion and Lady Gaga. This music takes back to the important, memorable, and moving moments of life: a first date, true love, strong and deep emotions. Producers of “A Date at the Movies” are 17-time Grammy winner Humberto Gatica, Yurii Shepeta, Assia Ahhatt and 2-time Grammy winner, Al Walser.

Discography 

 1999 — Homo Novus
 2002 — To You, Anais
 2003 — Chocolate
 2005 — Soul Hurts
 2006 — Hot Kisses, I Like It
 2007 — I Am the Best
 2010 — Angels Don't Smoke
 2013 — If Only Tonight
 2014 — Fiesta in San Juan
 2016 — Disco
 2017 — You Will Miss Me, Perepletaet, All-In
 2019 — A Music Extravaganza (Live-In concert and album)
 2020 — A Date at the Movies

Filmography 

 2010 —In Laws for NY

References

External links 
 

 
 

Women violinists
21st-century Ukrainian women singers
Women classical violinists
1965 births
Living people
Recipients of the title of Merited Artist of Ukraine